Haynes is an unincorporated community in Hocking County, in the U.S. state of Ohio.

History
A post office called Haynes was established in 1873, and remained in operation until 1913. Members of the Haynes family were considered prominent settlers in the area, according to local history.

References

Unincorporated communities in Hocking County, Ohio
Unincorporated communities in Ohio